is a Japanese freestyle wrestler. She won the gold medal in the 53 kg event at the 2020 Summer Olympics held in Tokyo, Japan.

Career 
She competed at the 2014 Youth Summer Olympics, 2017 World Wrestling Championships, 2018 World Wrestling Championships, and 2019 World Wrestling Championships.

In 2018, she won a gold medal at Budapest World Wrestling Championships in women's 55 kg.

She won the gold medal in the 55kg event at the 2022 World Wrestling Championships held in Belgrade, Serbia.

See also
 List of Youth Olympic Games gold medalists who won Olympic gold medals

References

External links 
 

1997 births
Living people
Japanese female sport wrestlers
World Wrestling Champions
People from Yokkaichi
Wrestlers at the 2014 Summer Youth Olympics
World Wrestling Championships medalists
Youth Olympic gold medalists for Japan
Shigakkan University alumni
Asian Wrestling Championships medalists
Wrestlers at the 2020 Summer Olympics
Olympic wrestlers of Japan
Medalists at the 2020 Summer Olympics
Olympic medalists in wrestling
Olympic gold medalists for Japan
21st-century Japanese women